The National Sea Grant College Program is a program of the National Oceanic and Atmospheric Administration (NOAA) within the U.S. Department of Commerce. It is a national network of 34 university-based Sea Grant programs involved in scientific research, education, training, and extension projects geared toward the conservation and practical use of the coasts, Great Lakes, and other marine areas. The program is administered by the National Oceanic and Atmospheric Administration (NOAA) with the national office located in Silver Spring, Maryland. There are Sea Grant programs located in every coastal and Great Lakes state as well as in Puerto Rico and Guam.

The program was instituted in 1966 when Congress passed the National Sea Grant College Program Act.

Sea Grant programs and colleges are not to be confused with land-grant colleges (a program instituted in 1862), space-grant colleges (instituted in 1988), or sun-grant colleges (instituted in 2003), although an institution may also be in one or more of the other programs concurrently with being a sea-grant institution.

History
At a 1963 meeting of the American Fisheries Society, a University of Minnesota professor, Athelstan Spilhaus, first suggested the establishment of Sea Grant colleges in universities that wished to develop oceanic work. The name "Sea Grant" was chosen to draw a parallel with the land-grant college program that was funded by grants of western lands to the states by the 1862 Morrill Land Grant Act of 1862. Early in the legislative process, there was consideration of leases of offshore parcels of ocean and sea bottom to fund the program by John A. Knauss and bill sponsor Claiborne Pell much like the 1862 land grants, but that plan was eventually scrapped in favor of direct congressional appropriation for the program.  The 1966 Act allowed the National Science Foundation (NSF) authority to initiate and support education, research, and extension by:

Encouraging and developing programs consisting of instruction, practical demonstrations, publications, and otherwise, by sea grant colleges and other suitable institutes, laboratories, and public and private agencies through marine advisory programs with the object of imparting useful information to person currently employed or interested in the various fields related to the development of marine resources, the scientific community, and the general public.

Signing of the 1966 Sea Grant College and Program Act into law by President Lyndon B. Johnson was on October 15, 1966, as Public Law 89-688. The only major subsequent change to the Sea Grant Act was with a 1970 Reorganization Plan, whereby the Office of Sea Grant was transferred from the National Science Foundation to the newly organized National Oceanic and Atmospheric Administration, where it still resides today.

Participating institutions
Institutions involved with the program include:

Pacific region
 Oregon State University
 University of Washington
 University of California, San Diego
 California Sea Grant
 University of Southern California
 University of Alaska Fairbanks' College of Fisheries and Ocean Sciences
 University of Hawaii at Manoa
 University of Guam

Southeastern Atlantic and Gulf of Mexico region
 Gulf of Mexico sub-region 
 Texas A&M University
 Louisiana State University
 Mississippi-Alabama Sea Grant Consortium
 Auburn University
 Dauphin Island Sea Lab
 Jackson State University
 Mississippi State University
 University of Alabama
 University of Alabama at Birmingham
 University of Mississippi
 University of Southern Mississippi
 University of South Alabama
 Southeast sub-region 
 Florida Sea Grant Consortium
University of Florida (Lead Institution)
Florida A&M University
Florida Atlantic University
Florida Gulf Coast University
Florida International University
Florida Institute of Technology
Florida State University
Harbor Branch Oceanographic Institute
Jacksonville University
Mote Marine Laboratory
New College of Florida
Nova Southeastern University
University of Central Florida
University of North Florida
University of South Florida
University of West Florida
University of Miami
 University of Georgia
 University of Puerto Rico
 South Carolina Sea Grant Consortium
 Clemson University
 South Carolina Department of Natural Resources
 Medical University of South Carolina
 The Citadel
 College of Charleston
 South Carolina State University
 Coastal Carolina University
 University of South Carolina

Mid-Atlantic region
 North Carolina State University
 East Carolina University
 Virginia Sea Grant
 College of William & Mary
 Virginia Institute of Marine Science
 Old Dominion University 
 Virginia Tech
 University of Virginia
 Virginia Commonwealth University
 George Mason University
 University of Maryland, College Park
 University of Delaware
 New Jersey Sea Grant Consortium
 Academy of Natural Sciences of Drexel
 Fairleigh Dickinson University
 Georgian Court University
 Kean University
 Marine Academy of Science and Technology
 Monmouth University
 Montclair State University
 New Jersey Institute of Technology
 Ramapo College of New Jersey
Raritan Valley Community College
 Rowan University
 Rutgers University
 Seton Hall University
 Stevens Institute of Technology
 Stockton University
 The College of New Jersey
 Union County College
William Paterson University

Northeast region
 New York Sea Grant (also participates in the Great Lakes Region)
 Stony Brook University
 State University of New York at Buffalo
 Cornell University
 University of Connecticut at Avery Point
 University of Rhode Island
 Massachusetts Institute of Technology
 Woods Hole Oceanographic Institution
 Lake Champlain Sea Grant (also participates in the Great Lakes region)
University of Vermont 
State University of New York at Plattsburgh
 University of New Hampshire
 University of Maine

Great Lakes region
 Pennsylvania State University
 Ohio State University
 Michigan Sea Grant
 Michigan State University
 University of Michigan
 Illinois-Indiana Sea Grant College Program
 University of Illinois at Urbana–Champaign
 Purdue University
 University of Wisconsin–Madison
 University of Minnesota, Duluth

See also
 Land-grant university
 National Space Grant College and Fellowship Program
 Sun grant colleges

References

External links
 Official website

Lists of universities and colleges in the United States
National Oceanic and Atmospheric Administration
1966 establishments in the United States